John W. Gunning (May 1, 1847 – November 20, 1910) was an American businessman, mechanic, and  politician.

Born in Rochester, New York, Gunning moved to Walworth County, Wisconsin in 1855 and then settled in Friendship, Adams County, Wisconsin. During the American Civil War, Gunning was the chief bugler of the 4th Wisconsin Volunteer Cavalry Regiment. Gunning was a mechanic. He was also in the loan, abstract, real estate, and insurance businesses. Gunning served as a town clerk and register of deeds for Adams County. In 1889, Gunning served in the Wisconsin State Assembly and was a Republican. Gunning died at St. Mary's Hospital in Rochester, Minnesota following surgery.

Notes

1847 births
1910 deaths
Politicians from Rochester, New York
People from Friendship, Wisconsin
People of Wisconsin in the American Civil War
Businesspeople from Wisconsin
County officials in Wisconsin
19th-century American politicians
Businesspeople from Rochester, New York
19th-century American businesspeople
Republican Party members of the Wisconsin State Assembly